Mohammad Alavi is the name of:
Mohammad Alavi (nuclear engineer), Iranian nuclear engineer
Mohammad Alavi (footballer) (born 1982), Iranian footballer
Mohammad Alavi (game developer), Iranian video game developer
Mohammad Alavi Gorgani (1940–2022), Iranian Twelver shi'a marja

See also 
Alavi (surname)